Kardar (Persian: کاردار ) is a family name in Iran, Afghanistan and Pakistan (Arain).
 Kardar (surname)

Persons
A. J. Kardar (1926–2002), Pakistani film director, producer and screenwriter
Abdul Hafeez Kardar (1925-1996), Pakistani international cricketer
Abdur Rashid Kardar (1904–1989), Pakistani and Indian film director 
Mehran Kardar, Iranian-American physicist

Kardar may also refer to:

Places
 Kardar, Byaban
 Kardar, Minab

See also

Karrar (name)